Sarah Janet Maas (born March 5, 1986) is an American fantasy author known for her fantasy series Throne of Glass and A Court of Thorns and Roses. As of 2022, she has sold over twelve million copies of her books and her work has been translated into 37 languages.

Early life 
Maas was born on March 5, 1986, in New York City. She grew up on the Upper West Side of Manhattan. Born to a Catholic mother and Jewish father, she was raised Jewish. As a child, she enjoyed creating stories based on popular tales or myths. She also used to write Sailor Moon fanfiction in her youth.

In 2008, Maas graduated magna cum laude from Hamilton College in Clinton, Oneida County, New York, where she majored in creative writing and minored in religious studies.

Personal life 
Maas married her husband Josh in 2010. She has a son and a daughter.

Career
Maas began writing what would become her debut novel, Throne of Glass, when she was sixteen years old. After writing several chapters of the novel, then titled Queen of Glass, Maas posted them on FictionPress.com, where it was one of the most popular stories on the site. It was later removed from the site when Maas decided to publish the novel. The story line of the series is based on the story of Cinderella, with the premise of "What if Cinderella was not a servant, but an assassin? And what if she didn't attend the ball to meet the prince, but to kill him, instead?" In 2008, Maas started sending the story to agents before signing with Tamar Rydzinski of The Laura Dial Literary Agency in 2009. Throne of Glass was purchased in March 2010 by Bloomsbury, who later purchased two additional books in the series. The series is available in 15 countries and 35 languages. While several prequel novellas set two years before the first novel were also published, these were later condensed into one book, The Assassin's Blade. The second book of the series, Crown of Midnight was a New York Times young adult best-seller. The final book in the series, Kingdom of Ash, was released on October 23, 2018; the finished series comprised seven books.

A Court of Thorns and Roses, Maas' second fantasy series, is a loose retelling of the traditional Beauty and the Beast. The first book of the trilogy was written in 2009, but was not published until 2015. Due to the success and popularity of the original series, it was extended and a spin-off series was announced which would feature stories of other popular characters. The fourth book in the series and the first of the spin-offs, A Court of Silver Flames was published on February 16, 2021.

On May 16, 2018, Maas announced her third fantasy series which is also her first adult fantasy series, Crescent City. The first book, titled House of Earth and Blood, was released by Bloomsbury on March 3, 2020. It was ranked one of the top twenty Science Fiction & Fantasy books of 2020 on Kobo. The sequel, House of Sky and Breath, was released on February 15, 2022. The third installation of the series,  House of Flame and Shadow, is set ro release in January of 2024.

She was ranked the fifth most popular author between 2016 and 2021 on Goodreads.

The A Court of Thorns and Roses series was announced to be adapted into a television series for Hulu in 2021. In an interview with The New York Times, Maas confirmed that she was developing the project with the writers and the showrunner as executive producer.

In February, 2023, the St. Johns (Florida) County School District removed three of her books and quarantined another.

Writing style and influences
In an interview with Writers & Artists, Maas told them that movie scores and classical music are her inspiration as a writer. She continued on to say that Sabriel written by Garth Nix and The Hero and the Crown by Robin McKinley began her love for reading fantasy and writing it. Her character development has been lauded as one of her best qualities for storytelling, with morally grey characters and strong world building.

Maas has mentioned that, "The sense of discovery is why I love writing so much. It’s a total thrill for me." Her books are known for heavy romantic themes, and Maas herself has said that her fantasy series A Court of Thorns and Roses "does skew older", sitting somewhere between young adult and adult genres.

Bibliography

Throne of Glass

Main
 The Assassin's Blade (2014)
 The Assassin and the Pirate Lord (2012)
 The Assassin and the Desert (2012)
 The Assassin and the Underworld (2012)
 The Assassin and the Empire (2012)
 The Assassin and the Healer (2013)
 Throne of Glass (2012)
 Crown of Midnight (2013)
 Heir of Fire (2014) 
 Queen of Shadows (2015) 
 Empire of Storms (2016)
 Tower of Dawn (2017) 
 Kingdom of Ash (2018)

Companion
 Throne of Glass Coloring Book (2016)

A Court of Thorns and Roses

Main
 A Court of Thorns and Roses (2015)
 A Court of Mist and Fury (2016)
 A Court of Wings and Ruin (2017)
 A Court of Silver Flames (2021)

Novella
 A Court of Frost and Starlight (2018)

Companion
 A Court of Thorns and Roses Coloring Book (2017)

Crescent City
 House of Earth and Blood (2020)
 House of Sky and Breath (2022)
 House of Flame and Shadow (2024)

Others
 Catwoman: Soulstealer (2018)

Adaptations 
In March 2020, it was announced that Sarah and Ron Moore will work together on adapting A Court of Thorns and Roses into a Hulu television series. The project will be produced by 20th Television. The release date is yet to be set.

Awards and nominations
Mass has received the following awards and nominations:

Accolades

References

External links
 

21st-century American novelists
21st-century American women writers
1986 births
American fantasy writers
American women novelists
American young adult novelists
Hamilton College (New York) alumni
Living people
Women writers of young adult literature
Women science fiction and fantasy writers
Writers from New York City
Novelists from New York (state)